William Rockhill Nelson (March 7, 1841 – April 13, 1915) was an American real estate developer and co-founder of The Kansas City Star in Kansas City, Missouri.  He donated his estate (and home) for the establishment of the Nelson-Atkins Museum of Art.

He is buried at Mt. Washington Cemetery with his wife, daughter and son-in-law.

Early life
Nelson was born in Fort Wayne, Indiana. His father was publisher Isaac De Groff Nelson (1810–1891) and his mother was Elizabeth Rockhill (1816–1889), the daughter of William R. Rockhill, an important farmer and politician in Fort Wayne, Indiana. For a short time, Isaac Nelson owned The Sentinel newspaper (which became the Fort Wayne News Sentinel). But I.D.G. Nelson, as he was fondly known for many years in Fort Wayne, was much more renowned as a nursery owner. His own estate, "Elm Park", was considered "the showplace of Allen County."

Nelson, as a 15-year-old attended the University of Notre Dame (which accepted high school students) at the time for two years which he described as "Botany Bay for bad boys." Notre Dame was reported to have asked that he not return.

He was admitted to the bar in 1862 and was a campaign manager for Democratic presidential nominee Samuel J. Tilden. Tilden told him: "While it is a great thing to lead armies, it is a greater thing to lead the minds of men."

Nelson attempted to run a store in Savannah, Georgia but it failed. The southern sojourn was to earn him the nickname "The Colonel" even though he never served in the military. William Allen White said later: "Not that he was ever a colonel of anything...He was just coloneliferous."

Newspapers
Nelson formally took over the Sentinel with Samuel Morss in 1879. In 1880 they moved to Kansas City and started the Star. At the time there were three daily competitors – the Evening Mail; The Kansas City Times; and the Kansas City Journal. Nelson took over sole ownership of the paper within a few months.

Nelson's business strategy called for cheap advance subscriptions and an intention to be "absolutely independent in politics, aiming to deal by all men and all parties with impartiality and fearlessness."

He purchased the Kansas City Evening Mail and its Associated Press franchise in 1882 and started the Weekly Kansas City Star in 1890 and the Sunday Kansas City Star in 1894. Nelson bought the Times in 1901, putting The Morning Kansas City Star on it.

Nelson had portraits of Tilden, Grover Cleveland, and Theodore Roosevelt in his office. Roosevelt stayed with Nelson at Oak Hall.

In one encounter, Kansas City Mayor Joseph J. Davenport was thrown down a stairwell at the Star building by editors (including William Allen White) when he was believed to have physically threatened Nelson. Nelson said afterwards, "The Star never loses!"

Other interests
In addition to his newspaper duties, Nelson developed an area of farmland south of downtown Kansas City into a neighborhood of more than 100 houses, including his own mansion called Oak Hall. The farm's mission was the development of improved breeding methods and livestock. It served as one of the world's leaders in animal health for more than 30 years.

He campaigned for Kansas City's George Kessler-designed park and boulevard system and the 1900 “Kansas City Spirit” to build Convention Hall in 90 days in order to host the 1900 Democratic National Convention after the original (and new) convention hall had burned in April 1900.

Legacy
Nelson provided in his will that following the death of his wife and daughter his Oak Hill mansion be torn down and its  estate turned into an art museum.  Proceeds from his $6 million estate were used to build the Nelson-Atkins Museum of Art in Kansas City.  Nelson's will also established a trust for Sni A Bar Farm, with Presidents from the University of Missouri, the University of Kansas, and the University of Oklahoma charged with selecting its trustees.

The Art Gallery originally contained a recreation of Nelson's oak paneled room from Oak Hall (and namesake of the estate). The room contained Nelson's red plush easy chair and bookcases.  The room was dismantled in 1988 to make way for a photography studio. His memorial is located in a mausoleum located at Mount Washington Cemetery in Independence, Missouri, between Truman Road and US Route 24.

References

External links

 

1841 births
1915 deaths
American real estate businesspeople
19th-century American newspaper founders
19th-century American newspaper publishers (people)
20th-century American newspaper founders
20th-century American newspaper publishers (people)
People from Kansas City, Missouri
People from Fort Wayne, Indiana
University of Notre Dame alumni
The Kansas City Star people
Kansas City Times people
Philanthropists from the Kansas City metropolitan area
19th-century American philanthropists